The Venerable Percy Harris Bowers  (1856–1922) was an eminent  Anglican priest in the late 19th and early 20th centuries.

Bowers was born at Swinton, Lancashire, and baptised 30 July 1856. He was educated at The Forest School and St John's College, Cambridge, graduating BA in 1880. Ordained in 1880, he was Rector of Market Bosworth  from 1886 and then Rural Dean of Sparkenhoe; and an Honorary Canon of Peterborough from 1913. He was the second Archdeacon of Loughborough and Warden of the Mission Clergy of the Diocese of Peterborough.

Notes

1856 births
People educated at Forest School, Walthamstow
Alumni of St John's College, Cambridge
Archdeacons of Loughborough
1922 deaths